Lori Foster is a best-selling American writer of over seventy romance novels. She also writes Urban Fantasy novels using her first and middle initials, L.L. Foster.Since first publishing in January 1996, Foster has become a USA Today, Publishers Weekly and New York Times bestselling author. Lori has published through a variety of houses, but is currently with Harlequin.

Bibliography

As Lori Foster

The Winston Brother

Tangled Sheets (Berkley, Feb 1999, in Hot Chocolate, The Winston Brothers and Wildly Winston)
Tangled Dreams (Berkley, Oct 1999, in Charmed, The Winston Brothers and Wildly Winston)
Tangled Images (In Sinful, The Winston Brothers and Wildly Winston)
Wild (Berkley, Jan 2002 and in Wildly Winston)
Deuces Wild (Berkley, Dec 2008, in Double the Pleasure)
Hart and Soul (Berkley, Dec 2009, in Double the Heat)

Visitation, North Carolina

Fantasy (Harlequin, March 1998, also In Unbelievable)
Say No to Joe? (Kensington, August 2003)
The Secret Life of Bryan (Kensington, March 2004)
When Bruce Met Cyn (Kensington, July 2004)
Just a Hint-Clint (Kensington, October 2004)
Jamie (Kensington, May 2005)

Sawyer Siblings Series

Little Miss Innocent? (Harlequin, February 1999 Also in Tempted)
Annie Get Your Guy (Harlequin, April 2017 Also in Tempted)
Messing Around with Max (Harlequin, March 2001 Also in Tempted)

PI & Men to the Rescue

Beguiled (Harlequin, September 1999 in The Private Eye and Fallen Angels)
Wanton (Harlequin, October, 1999, in Fallen Angels)
Caught in the Act (Harlequin, September 2001, in Enticing)
Treat Her Right (Harlequin, October 2001, in Heartbreakers)
Mr. November (Harlequin, November 2001, in Heartbreakers)

The Men of Courage

Trapped (Harlequin, September, 2015, in All Riled Up)
Riley (Harlequin, May, 2003) (In All Riled Up and Bodyguard)
Uncovered (In Fallen Angels and Hot in Here)
Tailspin (Harlequin August 2004, in Truth About Cats and Dogs and Hot in Here)
An Honorable Man (Harlequin May 2003, in Men of Courage and Hot in Here)

The Buckhorn Brothers Series

Sawyer (Harlequin, June 2000, also in Once and Again, Buckhorn Beginnings and Lori Foster Bundle)
Morgan (Harlequin, July 2000, also in Once and Again, Buckhorn Beginnings and Lori Foster Bundle)
Gabe (Harlequin, August 2000, also in Forever and Always, Forever Buckhorn and Lori Foster Bundle)
Jordan (Harlequin, September 2000, also in Forever and Always, Forever Buckhorn and Lori Foster Bundle)Casey (Harlequin, December 2002, also in Enticing and Buckhorn Legacy)Buckhorn Ever After (Harlequin HQN, in June 2013, also in Animal Attraction and All For You)Previously published as Shohn (Harlequin, September 2017)Back to Buckhorn (Harlequin HQN, in June 2014) 
Previously published as Garrett (Harlequin, September 2017)A Buckhorn Summer, Harlequin HQN, in June 2015) [E-book]
Previously published as Gray (Harlequin, October 2017)A Buckhorn Bachelor, Harlequin HQN, in June 2016) [E-book]
Previously published as Adam (Harlequin, October 2017)A Buckhorn Baby (Harlequin HQN, June 2017) [E-book]Tucker (Harlequin, June 2018) [E-book]

 The Brava Girlfriends Series Satisfy Me (Kensington, October 2001, in All Through the Night, Kiss Me Again and Truth or Dare)Indulge Me (Kensington, August 2002, in I Love Bad Boys and Truth or Dare)Drive Me Wild (Kensington, November 2002, in I Brake for Bad Boys and Truth or Dare)

The Brava Brothers SeriesToo Much Temptation (Kensington, March 2002)Never Too Much (Kensington, October 2002)The Christmas Present (Kensington, October 2008, in I'm Your Santa)

The Watson Brothers SeriesMy House, My Rules (Kensington, April 2003, in Bad Boys on Board and The Watson Brothers)Bringing Up Baby (Kensington, November 2003, in Bad Boys to Go and The Watson Brothers)Good With His Hands (Kensington, May 2004, in Bad Boys in Black Tie and The Watson Brothers)

Jude's & Murphy's SeriesJude's Law (Kensington, February 2006)Murphy's Law (Kensington, September 2006)

Carlisles seriesLove Unleashed (Harlequin, Feb 2006, in Love Bites)Love Won't Wait (Kensington, December 2013, in Turn up the Heat)Built for Love (Harlequin, November 2016)

SWAT Guy SeriesLuscious (Kensington, Jun 2006, in Bad Boys of Summer)

Fighter seriesCausing Havoc (Harlequin, Feb 2007)Simon Says (Berkley, Jul 2007)Hard to Handle (Berkley, Feb 2008)My Man Michael (Berkley, Feb 2009)Tails of Love (Berkley, Jun 2009)Double the Heat (Berkley, Dec 2009)Back in Black (Berkley, Feb 2010)

The JardinesHave Mercy (Berkley, Aug 2009, in Out of the Light into the Shadows)Total Control (writing as L. L. Foster) (In Out of the Light into the Shadows)Christmas Candi (writing as L. L. Foster) (Self Published, Dec 2009) [E-book]

Men Who Walk to the Edge of Honor SeriesReady, Set, Jett! (Harlequin HQN, Feb 2011, in The Guy Next Door)When You Dare (Harlequin HQN, Apr 2011)Trace of Fever (Harlequin HQN, May 2011)Savor the Danger (Harlequin HQN, Jun 2011)A Perfect Storm (Harlequin HQN, Apr 2011)What Chris Wants (Harlequin HQN, Jan 2013) [E-book]

Love Undercover SeriesRun the Risk (Harlequin HQN, September, 2012)Bare It All (Harlequin HQN, April 2013)Getting Rowdy (Harlequin HQN, September 2013)Dash of Peril (Harlequin HQN, March 2014)

Ultimate seriesHard Knocks (Harlequin HQN, 2014) [E-book]No Limits (Harlequin HQN, 2014)Holding Strong (Harlequin HQN, March 31, 2015)Tough Love (Harlequin HQN, August 18, 2015)Fighting Dirty (Harlequin HQN, April 2016)

Guthrie Brothers SeriesDon't Tempt Me (Harlequin HQN, July 2016)Worth the Wait (Harlequin HQN, July 2017)

Body Armor SeriesUnder Pressure (Harlequin HQN, January 2017, an extended excerpt is also in Wild Winter Nights)
ebook contains a short story Built for LoveHard Justice (Harlequin HQN, March 2017)Close Contact (Harlequin HQN, November 2017)Fast Burn (Harlequin HQN, April 2018)

Summer Resort SeriesCooper's Charm (Harlequin HQN, July 2018)Sisters of Summer's End (Harlequin HQN, June 11, 2019)

Road to Love SeriesDriven to Distraction (Harlequin HQN, November 20, 2018)Slow Ride  (Harlequin HQN, March 26, 2019)

 Stand alones Impetuous (Harlequin, Jan 1996 also in Charade)Outrageous (Harlequin, Apr 1997 also in Under His Skin, Bodyguard, and Charade)Scandalized (Harlequin, Nov 1997 also in Scandalous)Taken! (Harlequin, Sep 1998 also in Caught!)Tantalizing (Harlequin, Jan 1999 also in Lip Service, Unzipped, and Unbelievable)Body Heat (In Sizzle! and Up in Flames)In Too Deep (Harlequin, Feb 2000 also in Bewitched)
 Say Yes (Harlequin, Mar 2000 also in Caught!)Married to the Boss (Harlequin, Oct 2000 also in Bewitched)
 Christmas Bonus (In All I Want For Christmas, On the Naughty List and Santa Baby)Sex Appeal (Harlequin, May 2001 also in Scandalous)Luring Lucy (In Hot and Bothered and Real Men Last All Night)Unexpected (Kensington, Sep 2003)Once in a Blue Moon (In Star Quality and Delicious)White Knight Christmas (In The Night Before Christmas and Yule Be Mine)Do You Hear What I Hear? (In A Very Merry Christmas and Yule Be Mine)Sweet Dreams (In The Power of Love)For the Love of Wendy (In The Gift of Love)Shelter from the Storm (In The Promise of Love)He Sees You When You're Sleeping (Harlequin, Nov 2015 also in Jingle Bell Rock and Give It Up)Some Like it Hot (Harlequin, Nov 2015 also in Give It Up and Perfect for the Beach)Playing Doctor (Harlequin, Nov 2015 also in Give It Up and When Good Things Happen to Bad Boys)Built for Love (Harlequin, 2016 in ebook Under Pressure)

As L. L. Foster
ServantThe Awakening (Berkley, Oct 2007)The Acceptance Berkley, Aug 2008)The Kindred (Berkley, 2009)

The JardinesHave Mercy (Writing as Lori Foster) (Berkley, Aug 2009, in Out of the Light into the Shadows)Total Control (Berkley, Aug 2009, in Out of the Light into the Shadows)Christmas Candi'' (Self Published, Dec 2009) [E-book]

Anthologies and collections

Awards

2001 – Romantic Times Magazine Career Achievement Award for Series Romantic Fantasy
2005 – Romantic Times Magazine Career Achievement Award for Contemporary Romance
2008 – "Editors' Pick for the Best of Romance" Amazon Best of 2008 awards

References

20th-century American novelists
20th-century American short story writers
21st-century American novelists
21st-century American short story writers
American romantic fiction writers
American women short story writers
American women novelists
Living people
Women romantic fiction writers
Year of birth missing (living people)
20th-century American women writers
21st-century American women writers